Coal Chamber is an American nu metal band formed by Dez Fafara and Meegs Rascón in Los Angeles, California in 1993. Prior to Coal Chamber, the two had also created the band She's in Pain, in 1992. The original lineup also consisted of bassist Rayna Foss and drummer Jon Tor. Mike Cox replaced Tor on drums shortly afterwards, and thus the Coal Chamber lineup was complete. After signing to Roadrunner Records, they released their debut album, Coal Chamber, in 1997.

Chamber Music followed two years later and featured the band's only charting single in the US, "Shock the Monkey". Their third album, Dark Days, was released in the spring of 2002. Nadja Peulen temporarily replaced Foss on bass for touring commitments, before joining on a permanent basis in 2002. Coal Chamber disbanded in 2003, after ten years together, and then reunited in 2011, with the lineup of Fafara, Cox, and Rascón, along with Chela Rhea Harper on bass. Peulen rejoined the band on bass in 2016, and Coal Chamber released their fourth album, Rivals, in 2015, before disbanding again in 2016. They then reunited a second time in 2022.

History

Formation and early years (1993–1995)
In late 1994, Dino Cazares of Fear Factory championed a demo tape by Coal Chamber, causing a huge local stir with gigs at The Roxy Theatre and Whisky a Go Go, eventually leading Roadrunner Records to offer the band a contract.

Fafara dropped out quite suddenly due to disagreements with his wife about the band. In the spring of 1995, he reunited with Coal Chamber, which ended his marriage but revitalized the band. With a renewed sense of energy, Coal Chamber was able to regain their deal with Roadrunner by the end of 1995.

Coal Chamber (1996–1998)

In 1996, Coal Chamber played at the first Ozzfest, acquired Mike "Bug" Cox, and recorded their first album, Coal Chamber, which was released on February 11, 1997. The record produced one single and a video, "Loco", directed by Nathan "Karma" Cox. The video was included as an extra after the ending credits of Dee Snider's film Strangeland. The band also recorded an exclusive song for the soundtrack, titled "Not Living".

In 1997, the band toured Europe with Machine Head, Napalm Death, and Skinlab, including a show at the Dynamo Festival in the Netherlands. Coal Chamber also supported Pantera on tour from September through December 1997, along with Anthrax. Also, in 1997 and 1998, the band opened for Megadeth during the Cryptic Writings tour.

Chamber Music (1999–2001)
Chamber Music was released in 1999. With the commercial success Coal Chamber received with the album, the band toured on headlining and festival tours. The band managed to catch the attention of Ozzy Osbourne's wife Sharon Osbourne, who became their manager.

That year, Coal Chamber took part in Insane Clown Posse's Amazing Jeckel Brothers Tour, along with musicians Biohazard, Krayzie Bone, Twiztid, and Mindless Self Indulgence. While Biohazard, Mindless Self Indulgence, Krayzie Bone, and Twiztid were well received by audiences, Coal Chamber was not. Insane Clown Posse fans were not purchasing tickets, as they did not like the band. For the three shows that Coal Chamber played, there were multiple ticket refunds. ICP member Violent J and his brother, Rob, made the decision to eliminate Coal Chamber from the tour; after doing so, there were no ticket refunds for the remaining tour dates. Insane Clown Posse claimed that Coal Chamber had been removed from the tour because of equipment problems, but later revealed the true reason for their actions on The Howard Stern Show on August 19, 1999. On air, Osbourne, who also appeared as a guest, informed Bruce and Utsler that Coal Chamber filed a lawsuit for breach of contract. Bassist Rayna Foss left temporarily during the tour due to her pregnancy and was filled in for by Nadja Peulen.

Coal Chamber later parted ways over personal and creative differences, a theme which continued within the band, causing them to take a break from touring and resulting in their non-participation in the Tattoo the Earth tour in 2000.

Dark Days and first disbandment (2002–2003)
The band followed up with their third album, Dark Days, in early 2002, to mixed reviews. Bass guitarist Rayna Foss had left the band to raise her daughter shortly after the album was recorded; she was replaced by Nadja Peulen, who had taken Foss's place during her pregnancy between the first two albums. Foss fell out with frontman Dez Fafara, saying that she and her husband had "found Christ" and would be leaving Coal Chamber for good.

In May 2002, it was announced that Coal Chamber had broken up after an on-stage altercation between Fafara and Rascón during a show in Lubbock, Texas. They had been fighting verbally before the show and continued to fight on-stage, with Rascón hitting Fafara in the head with the headstock of his guitar. Fafara announced "This is the last Coal Chamber show ever!", and stormed offstage. The band attempted to continue the show with Rascón singing vocals, but soon stopped the show altogether. Cox demolished his drumkit before storming offstage. The band managed to patch things up long enough for an appearance on Last Call with Carson Daly and a summer tour with American Head Charge, Lollipop Lust Kill, and Medication. These were the last shows they played.

In October 2002, Cox was fired after several personal disputes with both Fafara and Rascón. The official release on the Coal Chamber website stated that the band was looking for a new drummer, although all band activities had come to a halt.

In late summer 2003, a compilation album titled Giving the Devil His Due was released, which included several demo tracks submitted by the band prior to their signing with Roadrunner Records in 1997, along with several alternative studio recordings and remixes of various tracks from their previous albums. Coal Chamber officially called it a day in 2003; Fafara continued with his new band DevilDriver (formerly known as Deathride).

After the breakup (2003–2010)
In August 2004, Roadrunner Records released The Best of Coal Chamber. In June 2005, Fafara stated that Coal Chamber's break was permanent and they would not be reforming. He also described a reformation as "like repeating the 4th grade again".

Fafara continued as vocalist of the metal band DevilDriver, recording seven albums: DevilDriver, The Fury of Our Maker's Hand, The Last Kind Words, Pray for Villains, Beast, Winter Kills, and Trust No One. He is the only member of Coal Chamber to release an album after the disbandment. Bass guitarist Nadja Puelen created the t-shirt company CruelTees. After taking two years off to recover from a car accident, drummer Mikey "Bug" Cox joined forces with his longtime friend and Orgy member Jay Gordon—and the producer of Coal Chamber's first album - to form Machine Gun Orchestra. Guitarist Meegs Rascón formed the rock band Glass Piñata, previously known as Piñata. The group released a few demos on their website, and faced several line-up changes before eventually disbanding. Following Glass Piñata, Rascón joined the Orange County rock/electro band NEO GEO in mid-2009, although he later left the band in 2010.

Fafara and Rascón settled their differences on October 24, 2008, with Rascón joining DevilDriver on stage at the Glasshouse in Pomona, California, to play "Loco".

In September 2009, it was announced that Peulen and Cox had joined forces to form an unnamed band. They were seeking a vocalist and guitarist to complete the lineup.

In September 2010, Rascón and Cox joined together in a post-punk band called We Are the Riot.

Reformation, Rivals, and second disbandment (2011–2017)

In September 2011, Fafara, Cox, and Rascón officially reformed the band with bass guitarist Chela Rhea Harper, to play the Soundwave festival in Australia. In October 2012, Fafara stated that the band were "taking it slow", partly due to his commitments with DevilDriver, but he also revealed that they had begun writing new material. The band later performed at Download 2013 and toured with Sevendust, Lacuna Coil, and Stolen Babies, with performances at Rock Am Ring, Graspop Metal Meeting in Dessel, and Nova Rock festival.

Nadja Peulen officially reunited with the band in October 2013, and they signed to Napalm Records the following year, as they continued to work on a new album. This was completed in December 2014. In February 2015, Coal Chamber revealed that the album's title was Rivals. They premiered the song "I.O.U. Nothing" online in March, and released a lyric video for "Suffer in Silence", which features Al Jourgensen, the following month. The album was released on May 19, 2015, and was their first studio album in 13 years, as well as their first to be released by Napalm Records.

In May 2016, Fafara confirmed during an interview with Blunt magazine that Coal Chamber was on indefinite hiatus, stating that due to the current success of his other band DevilDriver, Coal Chamber "has no place in my life whatsoever at this point." In June 2017, Fafara explained that he would start performing Coal Chamber songs with DevilDriver, coming to the realization that Coal Chamber would probably never tour or make music ever again. He then went on to say that the band is "done forever". In July 2018, Fafara officially announced that Coal Chamber was not coming back.
In 2020, Fafara spoke about the band's status during an interview with Metal Hammer. When asked about a possible reunion, Fafara stated: "I'm not gonna say no, because we've all spoken", adding, "The main thing for me is that the relationship is all good after numerous fallouts in the beginning and after some stuff went horribly wrong when we got back together to release [2015 comeback album] Rivals. The vibe in that camp is very cool at the moment, and we all have each other's backs. I wouldn't put it past us, but right now I'm definitely concentrating on Devildriver".

Second reformation (2022–present)
Coal Chamber announced their second reunion in November 2022, as well as their scheduled appearance at the 2023 Sick New World Festival in Las Vegas, Nevada. Fefara, Rascón, Cox, and Peulen had all posted messages individually as well.

Musical style, influences, and legacy
Coal Chamber have been categorized as nu metal, alternative metal, gothic metal, rap metal, and hard rock. Their self-titled album falls into the first category. Elements of hip hop and heavy metal are featured throughout the album. Coal Chamber's second album, Chamber Music, is also mainly nu metal, with elements of other genres such as gothic rock, industrial, and electronic music. Their final has groove metal influences and moves away from their gothic older sound.

The band's influences include Bad Brains, Metallica, Duran Duran, Fear Factory, The Cure, Bauhaus, Machine Head, and Jane's Addiction.

Coal Chamber is considered to be one of the bands that defined the nu metal sound. Alternative Press wrote, "Nü metal would never have left the starting gates if it weren't for the achievements of Coal Chamber. Established in 1993, the L.A. outfit expertly weaved frantic hip-hop-infused vocal rhythms between chugging guitars like they always belonged together. Dez Fafara's predecessor to DevilDriver established the no-nonsense side of nü metal that bridged the gap between straight-up heavy metal and goring industrial set to an infectious tempo. "Loco" and "Fiend" paved the way for the darker side of nü metal to step into the limelight beyond the lifespan of Coal Chamber themselves."

Revolver magazine talked about the impact of the band's self-titled debut: "Coal Chamber may have looked more like industrial goths at the warehouse rave than nu-metal moshers in the Ozzfest pit, but don't judge a coal by its chamber. Led by future DevilDriver frontman Dez Fafara, the L.A. band's 1997 self-titled debut rages somewhere between the rabbit-like springiness of Korn, the ragged grooves of Sepultura and the apoplectic rap-metal tantrums that would become Slipknot's calling card a couple years down the pike. "Loco" is the hit, but other cuts like "Oddity" and "Big Truck" will scratch that itch for the genre's heavier, more confrontational early days."

Band members

Current
 Dez Fafara – lead vocals (1993–2003, 2011–2016, 2022–present)
 Miguel Rascón – guitars, keyboards, backing vocals (1993–2003, 2011–2016, 2022–present)
 Mike Cox – drums (1994–2002, 2011–2016, 2022–present)
 Nadja Peulen – bass (1999–2000, 2002–2003, 2013–2016, 2022–present)

Past
 Rayna Foss – bass (1993–1999, 2001–2002)
 Chela Rhea Harper – bass  (2011–2013) 
 John Tor – drums  (1993–1994)

Timeline

Discography

Studio albums

Compilation albums

Singles

Music videos

References

External links

 Coal Chamber on Myspace

1993 establishments in California
American alternative metal musical groups
American gothic metal musical groups
Nu metal musical groups from California
Musical groups established in 1993
Musical groups disestablished in 2003
Musical groups disestablished in 2016
Musical groups reestablished in 2011
Musical groups from Los Angeles
Musical quartets
Roadrunner Records artists
Napalm Records artists